The Men's high jump athletics events for the 2016 Summer Paralympics took place at the Rio Olympic Stadium from September 8 to September 17, 2016. A total of three events were contested for three different classifications.

Schedule

Medal summary

Results

T42

T44

References

Athletics at the 2016 Summer Paralympics
2016 in men's athletics